Divina, está en tu corazón, or Love Divina, is a Spanish-language telenovela created by Mario Schajris and produced by Televisa, Pol-ka Producciones and Federation Kids & Family. It is a youth telenovela in the musical and comedy genres.

Plot 
Divina, está en tu corazón tells the story of a sweet and responsible teenager who grew up without a family. With a great knowledge of the life in the street, Divina takes a group of homeless children under her care. The mysterious Irene, who turns out to be the grandmother she lost a long time ago and who longs to approach Divina and repair her past mistakes, leads them all to live in her mansion and rescues them from social services. Divina, who secretly dreams of becoming a pop star, lives with her friends and the wealthy family of Irene - including Felipe, the love of her life - quickly forging new friendships as new and relentless rivalries.

Cast 
 Laura Esquivel as Divina
 Manuel Masalva as Felipe
 Ingrid Martz as Brisa
 Harold Azuara as Axel
 Ale Müller as Catalina
 Vanesa Butera as Soraya
 Nora Cárpena as Irene
 Matías Mayer as Pierre
 Thelma Fardin as Yanina
 Jenny Martínez as Sofía
 Julieta Vetrano as Meli
 Gabriel Gallichio as Ciro
 Marcelo D'Andrea as Fidel
 Abril Sanchez as Jazmín
 Camila Zolezzi as Olivia
 Leonel Hucalo as Lolo

Soundtrack

Divina is the soundtrack by youth telenovela Love Divina, released on March 17, 2017 by Universal Music Argentina.

Singles
"Corazón de Terciopelo" was released as first and only single from the soundtrack on January 9, 2017.

Track listing

Release history

References 

Televisa telenovelas
Pol-ka telenovelas
Argentine telenovelas
Mexican telenovelas
2017 Argentine television series debuts
2017 Argentine television series endings
2017 telenovelas
Television series about teenagers